Masthala is a monotypic snout moth genus described by Francis Walker in 1864. Its single species, Masthala favillalella, was described by the same author in the same year. It is found in Australia.

References

Moths described in 1864
Phycitinae
Monotypic moth genera
Moths of Australia